Catherine Swing is a Canadian television personality, actor, producer, director and former Miss Canada.

Swing won the Miss Canada pageant in 1978, after having won the Miss Toronto crown while she was a student at York University. Over the next year she made public appearances in different parts of the country. She talked with the challenges of being Miss Canada with the press, most notably the lack of control over her own schedule. Swing was not able to compete in the 1978 Miss Universe pageant as had what the papers called "marriage plans".

In 1980, she created Just Like Mom, a television game show which ran on CTV until 1985; from the second season onwards she co-hosted the show with her then-husband Fergie Olver. In 2009 a new version of the show was announced and Swing served as a consultant. After Just Like Mom concluded, Swing continued to work in television as an actor and director.

Filmography

References

External links

20th-century births
Living people
Miss Canada winners
Canadian game show hosts
Canadian television actresses
Year of birth missing (living people)